Katherine Alena Foley (May 10, 1889 – February 20, 1981) was an Irish-American politician who represented the 3rd Essex district in the Massachusetts House of Representatives from 1935–1938. She was the first woman to receive a major party's nomination for statewide office in Massachusetts.

Personal life
Born in Ireland, she emigrated to Lawrence, Massachusetts as a child. She attended the Lawrence Public Schools and then Cannon's Commercial College. Her husband, Mark Foley, died just before she took her seat in the Massachusetts House. They had three daughters together.

Foley was a member of the St. Clare League of Catholic Women. She died February 20, 1981. Her funeral was held at St. Augustne's Church in Andover, Massachusetts and she was buried at Immaculate Conception Cemetery in Lawrence.

Career
Foley was introduced to politics by her brother Peter Carr, who was a Lawrence alderman, state representative, and state boxing commissioner. During her husband's illness, Foley decided to enter politics as a way to bring in money while her husband was out of work. She ran for, and lost, a seat in the Massachusetts House in 1932, but was victorious in 1934 and reelected in 1936.

In 1938, she sponsored a bill which eliminated breach of promise or "heart balm" suits. That same year she became the first foreign-born woman to preside over a session of the Massachusetts House of Representatives. In 1938 and 1940 she was the Democratic nominee for Massachusetts Secretary of the Commonwealth, becoming the first woman to ever win a major party's nomination for statewide office. She then served 12 years as directory of the Massachusetts Division of Minimum Wages.

Governor Paul Dever then appointed Foley as the assistant director of labor and industry in 1950. Foley retired in 1953.

See also
 1935-1936 Massachusetts legislature
 1937-1938 Massachusetts legislature

References

1889 births
1981 deaths
American Roman Catholics
Irish emigrants to the United States (before 1923)
Democratic Party members of the Massachusetts House of Representatives
People from Andover, Massachusetts
Politicians from Lawrence, Massachusetts
Women state legislators in Massachusetts